is a Japanese mixed martial artist who currently competes in DEEP's flyweight division, and formerly fought in DEEP's bantamweight division, the latter of which he is a former champion, recently losing the title to Daiki Hata who is still the reigning champion. With a professional career spanning 10 years, Maeda has competed in notable Japanese promotions such as Pancrase, PRIDE FC and DREAM, as well as the WEC in America.

Mixed martial arts career

Early career
Going 0–1–2 as an amateur in 2002, Maeda made his professional debut in 2003 with a second round technical submission of Shigeyuki Umeki. Between his pro debut and 2005, Maeda racked a record of 17–2–1, with wins coming under the Pancrase and DEEP banners.

World Extreme Cagefighting
Following a drop in weight to the bantamweight division, Maeda debuted in the WEC with a first-round KO due to a kick to the body against King of the Cage champion, Charlie Valencia. With this win, Maeda was given a title shot against bantamweight champion, Miguel Torres. In a back and forth battle, both men landed hard shots on the feet and exchanged submission attempts on the ground. Maeda would lose due to doctor stoppage in the third round due to severe swelling of his right eye. The fight earned Fight of the Night honors.

Maeda would then face BJJ black belt, Rani Yahya, in a catchweight bout of 137 pounds at WEC 36. Maeda lost by submission due to a guillotine choke in the first round. Following this loss, Maeda would be released from his WEC contract after going 1–2 in the promotion.

DREAM
In his first bout under the DREAM banner, Maeda defeated Micah Miller by unanimous decision. Followed by a controversial first-round KO loss to Hiroyuki Takaya, he rebounded with a win over former WEC champion Chase Beebe. Once again, Maeda would lose by KO, this time to former WEC champion Cole Escovedo. Maeda is 0-4 within DREAM since his loss to Escovedo in 2010.

World Victory Road
Yoshiro Maeda fought former Sengoku featherweight champion, Masanori Kanehara, in December 2010. Maeda won by first-round TKO.

Championships and accomplishments

Mixed martial arts
Deep
Deep Bantamweight Championship (one time; former)
One successful title defense
2005 Deep Bantamweight Championship Tournament Runner Up
Pancrase
King of Pancrase Featherweight Championship (one time; former)
One successful title defense
2006 King of Pancrase Featherweight Championship Tournament Winner
2003 Pancrase Neo Blood Featherweight Tournament Winner
World Extreme Cagefighting
Fight of the Night (One time) vs. Miguel Torres

Mixed martial arts record

|-
| Win
| align=center| 39–19–5
|Mitsuhisa Sunabe
|Decision (unanimous)
|Rizin 32
|
|align=center|3
|align=center|5:00
|Okinawa, Japan
|
|-
| Loss
| align=center| 38–19–5
| Tatsuro Taira
| Technical Submission (rear-naked choke)
| Shooto 0320
| 
| align=center| 1
| align=center| 1:01
| Tokyo, Japan
| 
|-
| Loss
| align=center| 38–18–5
| Ryuya Fukuda
| TKO (Punches)
| Shooto 0712
| 
| align=center| 3
| align=center| 4:57
| Osaka, Japan
| 
|-
| Win
| align=center| 38–17–5
| Payoongsak Singchalad
| Submission (Rear naked choke)
| DEEP & Pancrase Osaka
| 
| align=center| 1
| align=center| 3:18
| Osaka, Japan
|
|-
| Win
| align=center| 37–17–5
| Koki Naito
| Decision (split)
| Shooto 30th Anniversary Tour 5th Round: In Osaka
| 
| align=center| 3
| align=center| 5:00
| Osaka, Japan
|
|-
| Loss
| align=center| 36–17–5
| Kiyotaka Shimizu
| TKO (punches)
| Shooto 1/27 at Korakuen Hall: 30th Anniversary Tour
| 
| align=center| 1
| align=center| 4:37
| Tokyo, Japan
|
|-
| Win
| align=center| 36–16–5
| Tadaaki Yamamoto
| Decision (unanimous)
| Shooto: Professional Shooto 6/17 in Osaka
| 
| align=center| 3
| align=center| 5:00
| Osaka, Japan
|
|-
| Win
| align=center| 35–16–5
| Young Han Kim
| KO (punches)
| Shooto: Professional Shooto 6/25 in Osaka
| 
| align=center| 1
| align=center| 0:54
| Osaka, Japan
|
|-
| Loss
| align=center| 34–16–5
| Hayato Ishii
| Decision (unanimous)
| Shooto: Professional Shooto 1/29
| 
| align=center| 3
| align=center| 5:00
| Tokyo, Japan
|
|-
| Win
| align=center| 34–15–5
| Kosuke Suzuki
| Submission (rear-naked choke)
| Shooto: Mobstyles Presents Fight & Mosh
| 
| align=center| 2
| align=center| 2:43
| Urayasu, Chiba, Japan
|
|-
| Win
| align=center| 33–15–5
| Takaki Soya
| Decision (unanimous)
| Vale Tudo Japan - VTJ 7th
| 
| align=center| 3
| align=center| 5:00
| Urayasu, Chiba, Japan
|
|-
| Win
| align=center| 32–15–5
| Kentaro Watanabe
| Decision (unanimous)
| Vale Tudo Japan - VTJ in Osaka
| 
| align=center| 3
| align=center| 5:00
| Osaka, Japan
|
|-
| Win
| align=center| 31–15–5
| Haruo Ochi
| Decision (majority)
| Deep - Dream Impact 2014: Omisoka Special
| 
| align=center| 3
| align=center| 5:00
| Saitama, Japan
|
|-
| Loss
| align=center| 30–15–5
| Yuki Motoya
| Submission (armbar)
| Deep - 67 Impact
| 
| align=center| 1
| align=center| 4:59
| Tokyo, Japan
|
|-
| Loss
| align=center| 30–14–5
| Ryuichi Miki
| Decision (unanimous)
| Vale Tudo Japan - VTJ 4th
| 
| align=center| 3
| align=center| 5:00
| Tokyo, Japan
| 
|-
| Draw
| align=center| 30–13–5
| Mamoru Yamaguchi
| Draw (majority)
| Deep - Tribe Tokyo Fight
| 
| align=center| 3
| align=center| 5:00
| Tokyo, Japan
| 
|-
|Loss
|align=center|30–13–4
|Daiki Hata
|TKO (punches)
|DEEP: 62nd Impact
|
|align=center|2
|align=center|1:41
|Tokyo, Japan
| 
|-
| Loss
| align=center| 30–12–4
| Bibiano Fernandes
| Technical Submission (triangle choke)
| Dream 18
| 
| align=center| 1
| align=center| 1:46
| Tokyo, Japan
| 
|-
| Win
| align=center| 30–11–4
| Tatsumitsu Wada
| Submission (rear-naked choke)
| Deep: 59th Impact
| 
| align=center| 3
| align=center| 2:32
| Tokyo, Japan
| 
|-
| Win
| align=center| 29–11–4
| Takafumi Otsuka
| Submission (rear-naked choke)
| Deep: 57th Impact
| 
| align=center| 2
| align=center| 3:13
| Tokyo, Japan
| 
|-
| Loss
| align=center| 28–11–4
| Hiroshi Nakamura
| Decision (majority)
| Deep: Cage Impact 2011 in Tokyo, 2nd Round
| 
| align=center| 3
| align=center| 5:00
| Tokyo, Japan
| 
|-
| Loss
| align=center| 28–10–4
| Hideo Tokoro
| TKO (corner stoppage)
| Dream: Fight for Japan!
| 
| align=center| 2
| align=center| 0:23
| Saitama, Saitama, Japan
| 
|-
| Win
| align=center| 28–9–4
| Masanori Kanehara
| TKO (punches)
| World Victory Road Presents: Soul of Fight
| 
| align=center| 1
| align=center| 1:27
| Tokyo, Japan
| 
|-
| Win
| align=center| 27–9–4
| Takafumi Otsuka
| Decision (majority)
| Deep: 50 Impact
| 
| align=center| 3
| align=center| 5:00
| Tokyo, Japan
| 
|-
| Loss
| align=center| 26–9–4
| Kenji Osawa
| Decision (split)
| Dream 14
| 
| align=center| 3
| align=center| 5:00
| Saitama, Saitama, Japan
| 
|-
| Loss
| align=center| 26–8–4
| Cole Escovedo
| KO (head kick)
| Dream 13
| 
| align=center| 1
| align=center| 2:29
| Yokohama, Japan
| 
|-
| Win
| align=center| 26–7–4
| Chase Beebe
| Submission (rear-naked choke)
| Dream 12
| 
| align=center| 1
| align=center| 3:26
| Osaka, Japan
| 
|-
| Win
| align=center| 25–7–4
| Kleber Koike Erbst
| DQ (groin shot)
| Deep: Osaka Impact
| 
| align=center| 1
| align=center| 4:00
| Osaka, Japan
| 
|-
| Loss
| align=center| 24–7–4
| Hiroyuki Takaya
| TKO (punches)
| Dream 9
| 
| align=center| 1
| align=center| 9:39
| Yokohama, Japan
| 
|-
| Win
| align=center| 24–6–4
| Micah Miller
| Decision (unanimous)
| Dream 7
| 
| align=center| 2
| align=center| 5:00
| Saitama, Saitama, Japan
| 
|-
| Loss
| align=center| 23–6–4
| Rani Yahya
| Submission (guillotine choke)
| WEC 36: Faber vs. Brown
| 
| align=center| 1
| align=center| 3:30
| Hollywood, Florida, United States
| 
|-
| Loss
| align=center| 23–5–4
| Miguel Torres
| TKO (doctor stoppage)
| WEC 34: Faber vs. Pulver
| 
| align=center| 3
| align=center| 5:00
| Sacramento, California, United States
| 
|-
| Win
| align=center| 23–4–4
| Charlie Valencia
| KO (kick to the body)
| WEC 32: Condit vs. Prater
| 
| align=center| 1
| align=center| 2:29
| Rio Rancho, New Mexico, United States
| 
|-
| Draw
| align=center| 22–4–4
| Kim Jong-Man
| Draw
| Deep: Protect Impact 2007
| 
| align=center| 3
| align=center| 5:00
| Osaka, Japan
| 
|-
| Win
| align=center| 22–4–3
| Johnny Frachey
| TKO (kicks and punches)
| Pancrase: Rising 6
| 
| align=center| 1
| align=center| 3:38
| Tokyo, Japan
| 
|-
| Win
| align=center| 21–4–3
| Danny Batten
| Decision (unanimous)
| Pancrase: Rising 4
| 
| align=center| 3
| align=center| 5:00
| Tokyo, Japan
| 
|-
| Win
| align=center| 20–4–3
| Manabu Inoue
| TKO (punches)
| Pancrase: Rising 1
| 
| align=center| 1
| align=center| 4:36
| Osaka, Japan
| 
|-
| Loss
| align=center| 19–4–3
| Joe Pearson
| Submission (guillotine choke)
| Pride - Bushido 13
| 
| align=center| 1
| align=center| 0:54
| Yokohama, Kanagawa, Japan
| 
|-
| Win
| align=center| 19–3–3
| Daiki Hata
| Decision (split)
| Pancrase: Blow 6
| 
| align=center| 3
| align=center| 5:00
| Yokohama, Kanagawa, Japan
| 
|-
| Win
| align=center| 18–3–3
| Atsushi Yamamoto
| KO (flying knee)
| Pancrase: Blow 5
| 
| align=center| 2
| align=center| 4:36
| Tokyo, Japan
| 
|-
| Loss
| align=center| 17–3–3
| Daiki Hata
| TKO (punches)
| Pancrase: Blow 2
| 
| align=center| 2
| align=center| 0:35
| Osaka, Japan
| 
|-
| Loss
| align=center| 17–2–3
| Masakazu Imanari
| Submission (toe hold)
| Deep: 22 Impact
| 
| align=center| 3
| align=center| 1:31
| Tokyo, Japan
| 
|-
| Win
| align=center| 17–1–3
| Muangfahlek Kiatwichkien
| KO (soccer kick)
| Deep: 22 Impact
| 
| align=center| 1
| align=center| 2:26
| Tokyo, Japan
| 
|-
| Win
| align=center| 16–1–3
| Tomomi Iwama
| KO (head kick)
| Deep: 21st Impact
| 
| align=center| 1
| align=center| 0:32
| Tokyo, Japan
| 
|-
| Win
| align=center| 15–1–3
| Miki Shida
| KO (punches)
| Pancrase: Spiral 7
| 
| align=center| 3
| align=center| 2:17
| Osaka, Japan
| 
|-
| Win
| align=center| 14–1–3
| Colin Mannsur
| TKO (punches)
| Pancrase: Spiral 6
| 
| align=center| 1
| align=center| 2:43
| Tokyo, Japan
| 
|-
| Loss
| align=center| 13–1–3
| Charles Bennett
| KO (punch)
| Pride: Bushido 7
| 
| align=center| 1
| align=center| 1:55
| Osaka, Japan
| 
|-
| Win
| align=center| 13–0–3
| Takumi Murata
| Submission (armbar)
| Pancrase: Spiral 3
| 
| align=center| 1
| align=center| 4:16
| Osaka, Japan
| 
|-
| Draw
| align=center| 12–0–3
| Masakazu Imanari
| Draw
| Deep: 18th Impact
| 
| align=center| 3
| align=center| 5:00
| Tokyo, Japan
| 
|-
| Win
| align=center| 12–0–2
| Minoru Tsuiki
| KO (punch and kick)
| Pancrase: Brave 12
| 
| align=center| 1
| align=center| 4:02
| Tokyo, Japan
| 
|-
| Win
| align=center| 11–0–2
| Fredson Paixão
| Decision (unanimous)
| Pancrase: Brave 7
| 
| align=center| 3
| align=center| 5:00
| Osaka, Japan
| 
|-
| Win
| align=center| 10–0–2
| Isamu Sugiuchi
| KO (punch)
| Pancrase: Brave 5
| 
| align=center| 1
| align=center| 1:32
| Tokyo, Japan
| 
|-
| Win
| align=center| 9–0–2
| Hiroshi Umemura
| Submission (armbar)
| Deep: 14th Impact
| 
| align=center| 1
| align=center| 2:26
| Osaka, Japan
| 
|-
| Win
| align=center| 8–0–2
| Alexandre Freitas
| TKO (flying knee and punches)
| Pancrase: Brave 2
| 
| align=center| 2
| align=center| 0:25
| Osaka, Japan
| 
|-
| Win
| align=center| 7–0–2
| Baret Yoshida
| KO (punches)
| Pancrase - Hybrid 10
| 
| align=center| 1
| align=center| 1:29
| Tokyo, Japan
| 
|-
| Win
| align=center| 6–0–2
| Satoshi Watanabe
| Decision (unanimous)
| Pancrase - Hybrid 8
| 
| align=center| 2
| align=center| 5:00
| Osaka, Japan
| 
|-
| Win
| align=center| 5–0–2
| Miki Shida
| Decision (unanimous)
| Pancrase - 2003 Neo-Blood Tournament Second Round
| 
| align=center| 2
| align=center| 5:00
| Tokyo, Japan
| 
|-
| Win
| align=center| 4–0–2
| Takahiro Sanehara
| TKO (punches)
| Pancrase - 2003 Neo-Blood Tournament Opening Round
| 
| align=center| 2
| align=center| 1:06
| Tokyo, Japan
| 
|-
| Win
| align=center| 3–0–2
| Shinya Sato
| Decision (majority)
| Pancrase - Hybrid 7
| 
| align=center| 2
| align=center| 5:00
| Osaka, Japan
| 
|-
| Win
| align=center| 2–0–2
| Mitsuhisa Sunabe
| Decision (unanimous)
| Pancrase - Hybrid 5
| 
| align=center| 2
| align=center| 5:00
| Yokohama, Kanagawa, Japan
| 
|-
| Win
| align=center| 1–0–2
| Shigeyuki Umeki
| Technical Submission (rear-naked choke)
| Pancrase - Hybrid 2
| 
| align=center| 2
| align=center| 1:49
| Osaka, Japan
| 
|-

Mixed martial arts exhibition record

| Draw
| align=center| 0–0–2
| Yasunori Yamada
| Draw (time limit)
| Pancrase - Spirit 6
| 
| align=center| 2
| align=center| 5:00
| Osaka, Japan
|
|-
| Draw
| align=center| 0–0–1
| Mikio Takeuchi
| Draw (time limit)
| Pancrase - Spirit 4
| 
| align=center| 2
| align=center| 5:00
| Osaka, Japan
|

See also
 List of current mixed martial arts champions
 List of male mixed martial artists

References

External links

Yoshiro Maeda's WEC profile

1981 births
Living people
Japanese male mixed martial artists
Bantamweight mixed martial artists
Flyweight mixed martial artists
Sportspeople from Kagawa Prefecture
Deep (mixed martial arts) champions
People from Takamatsu, Kagawa